Jennings v Rice (EWCA Civ 159; 2002) is an English land law case concerning proprietary estoppel.

Facts
Mr Jennings, a gardener and bricklayer, sued the administrators of his former employer, for a large house and furniture (worth £435,000) on the ground that he had been given an assurance he would get it. Jennings worked as gardener of Mrs Royle since 1970 and from the late 1980s had increasingly begun to care for her, doing washing (laundry), helping dressing, shopping, overnight security following a break-in and in going to the toilet. She was running out of money and could not continue to pay him. She told him he need not worry about that since “he would be alright” and with more doubt expressed by the court, as to the claimant's recollection of exact words, perhaps words to the effect that “this will all be yours one day”, if not the court deemed then similar promises.  Royle (who lived at Lawn House, Shapwick, Somerset) died in August 1997, aged 93, without a will and without issue.

Jennings claimed that either he had: a claim under the Inheritance (Provision for Family and Dependants) Act 1975; or under a contract regarding land not falling foul of the Acts on formalities; or that he had a right to the house under the doctrine of proprietary estoppel. The administrator contested all three heads of claim.

The High Court awarded Jennings £200,000 taking into account the payments he had foregone, finding proprietary estoppel. It rejected his dependency claim, and stated that Royle's words had been too vague to make a contract or quasi-contract.  The Court of Appeal approved the first instance decision on quantum:

The judge reminded himself that the house was valued at £420,000 and was not a suitable house for [Jennings] to live in on his own and he took into account that [Royle] had no special obligations to her family. He said that to reward an employee on the scale of £420,000 was excessive. He also compared the cost of full-time nursing care, which he estimated at £200,000, with the value of the house. He reasoned that [Jennings] would probably need £150,000 to buy a house. He concluded:
"I do not think that he could complain that he had been unfairly treated if he had been left £200,000 in [Royle]'s will. Most people would say that she would, at least, then have performed her promise to see him all right. The quality of her assurance affects not only questions of belief, encouragement, reliance and detriment, but also unconscionability and the extent of the equity.

In my judgment the minimum necessary to satisfy the equity in the present case is the sum of £200,000."

Jennings appealed to the Court of Appeal for the full value of the house (under the found proprietary estoppel). Rice 
for the statutory beneficiaries of the death estate argued including the nieces and nephews argued that instead of the full value of the house — the maximum awardable — the reviewing court should uphold the decision below which took into account the actual detriment experienced.

Judgment
The Court of Appeal held that the High Court had made a correct assessment: proportionality was essential between expectation and detriment in deciding how to satisfy an equity based on proprietary estoppel. The detriment to Jennings was more difficult to establish than his expectation, however courts must consider unconscionability. Holding that the appeal should be dismissed, Robert Walker LJ's leading judgment reasoned:

See also

English contract law

References

English land case law
2002 in case law
2002 in British law
Court of Appeal (England and Wales) cases